Douglas Boulivar (1947 in Staten Island, NY, 1947 – October 1, 2009, New York City) dancer, dance teacher and choreographer. trained at the Royal Ballet School and performed with the Repertory Dance Theatre, Ballet of the 20th Century, Dancers in Repertory, Bill Evans, Anna Sokolow and Mel Wong. He taught ballet and Rommett Floor Barre for the Alvin Ailey American Dance Theater, Steps on Broadway, Dance New Amsterdam and Les Ballets Jazz de Montréal, among others.

He was the director of Dancers in Repertory, which first performed in 1981.

References

American male ballet dancers
Ballet teachers
American contemporary dancers
1947 births
2009 deaths
20th-century American ballet dancers